The 1983 Pan American Games were held in Caracas, Venezuela from August 14 to August 29, 1983. The games were the first major international competition to include relatively accurate steroid testing.

Host city selection 

Four cities submitted bids to host the 1983 Pan American Games that were recognized by the Pan American Sports Organization (PASO); however, only one city, Hamilton, Ontario submitted their bid on time. On April 23, 1977, Caracas, Venezuela was selected over Hamilton, Canada in a two-city vote to host the IX Pan American Games by the PASO at its general assembly in San Juan, Puerto Rico.

Medal count 

To sort this table by nation, total medal count, or any other column, click on the  icon next to the column title.

Sports

 Archery
 Athletics
 Baseball
 Basketball
 Boxing
 Cycling
 Diving
 Equestrian
 Fencing
 Football (soccer)
 Gymnastics
 Field Hockey
 Judo
 Rowing
 Sailing
 Shooting
 Softball
 Sambo
 Swimming
 Synchronized swimming
 Table tennis
 Tennis
 Volleyball
 Weightlifting
 Wrestling

Doping

Mascot

The 1983 Games' mascot was a lion holding a 1983 sign named Santiaguito.

References

External links
 Caracas 1983 - IX Pan American Games - Official Report at PanamSports.org

 
Pan American Games
Pan
P
Multi-sport events in Venezuela
Pan American Games
Pan American Games
20th century in Caracas
Pan American Games